Richfield Public School Academy is a free, public charter school located in Flint, Michigan formerly managed by Mosaica Education but now self managed by the Richfield Board of Directors. It offers grades 3–8 at the main building and a Montessori pre-school program off-site. Grades K-2 are located at Richfield Early Learning Center at 4358 Richfield Road in Flint.

External links
Richfield Public School Academy website

Buildings and structures in Flint, Michigan
Charter schools in Michigan
Education in Flint, Michigan
Public elementary schools in Michigan
Public middle schools in Michigan